Burrell Township may refer to the following townships in the United States:

 Burrell Township, Decatur County, Iowa
 Burrell Township, Armstrong County, Pennsylvania
 Burrell Township, Indiana County, Pennsylvania